SDSS J1229+1122 (SDSS J122952.66+112227.8) is a blue supergiant O-type star in the tail of dwarf irregular galaxy IC 3418. It illuminates a nebula clump of gas, and was discovered from the spectrum of the illumination source. The clump of gas resides in a tail caused by ram pressure stripping of gas from the galaxy by the galaxy cluster. It was determined to be a blue supergiant through analysis of its spectrum.

(The record for the most distant star is, as of June 2017, a strongly lensed star at redshift 1.5 behind the galaxy cluster MACS1149.) The discovery was made by Drs. Youichi Ohyama and Ananda Hota, using the Subaru Telescope.

The star and its galaxy are in the Virgo Cluster of galaxies. The clump of gas that the star illuminates is referred to as D3 or IC3418 D3, and lies within a filamentary structure referred to as F1 or IC3418 F1. The galactic tail and all within it are escaping the galaxy to become intracluster flotsam, unattached to any galaxy, just the cluster.

References

Stars in IC 3418
O-type supergiants
Extragalactic stars
IC 3418 
Virgo Cluster
Virgo (constellation)
SDSS objects